Álvaro or Alvaro Morales may refer to:
Álvaro Morales (actor) (born 1968), Chilean actor
Álvaro Morales (sportscaster), Guatemalan sports anchor and analyst
Alvaro Morales (urologist), Canadian urologist and academic